Big Dipper was a wooden roller coaster located at the defunct Geauga Lake amusement park in Bainbridge Township, Ohio. Originally opened in 1925 as Sky Rocket, it was renamed Clipper in the late 1940s and eventually Big Dipper in 1969. It was the oldest operating roller coaster in Ohio and seventh-oldest in the United States when it closed in 2007. Designed by John A. Miller, the Big Dipper was also one of the last remaining roller coasters in the world from the designer. American Coaster Enthusiasts awarded the coaster its ACE Coaster Classic and ACE Coaster Landmark designations. Efforts to sell, preserve, and restore the ride were unsuccessful. The ride was demolished on October 17, 2016.

History
For the 1925 season, Geauga Lake amusement park underwent an expansion that included the addition of Sky Rocket, a wooden roller coaster from renowned coaster designer John A. Miller. Miller designed over 140 roller coasters and contributed over 100 patented technologies to the roller coaster industry, some of which are still in use on modern-day coasters. It was renamed Clipper in the late 1940s, and then again to Big Dipper in 1969 after Funtime purchased the park.

Big Dipper underwent major renovations in 1980. The ride was retracked by Martin & Vleminckx.

Closure 

On September 21, 2007, Cedar Fair announced that the amusement park portion of Geauga Lake would close leaving only the water park, Wildwater Kingdom. With Big Dipper's future uncertain, preservationists and coaster enthusiasts grew concerned over its fate. The coaster first sold at an auction of the park's rides in June 2008, and minor damage to the structure was repaired in late 2008.

The Big Dipper was put up for auction again in 2010. It was listed online at eBay with a starting bid price of $9,500 and a "buy it now" price of $65,000. The auction ended without any bids on September 6, 2010. Later that month, two enthusiasts teamed up to purchase the ride, but the deal collapsed in January 2011 as a result of various legal issues surrounding the sale. They were planning to disassemble and store the coaster in an area close to the park. The roller coaster remained closed, and in September 2016, Cedar Fair announced plans to dismantle and scrap the ride. Demolition completed on October 17, 2016.

References

External links

Official Save the Big Dipper Website
UltimateRollerCoaster.com - Unofficial Page
Geauga Lake at Top Roller Coasters and Amusement Parks

Roller coasters operated by Cedar Fair
Roller coasters operated by Six Flags
Geauga Lake
Former roller coasters in Ohio
Buildings and structures demolished in 2016
Demolished buildings and structures in Ohio